Katie Parker (born 19 February 1979)   is an Australian Paralympic tandem cycling pilot. She won a silver medal at the 2008 Beijing Games with Felicity Johnson in the Women's 1 km Time Trial B VI 1–3 event.

References

1979 births
Paralympic cyclists of Australia
Cyclists at the 2008 Summer Paralympics
Paralympic silver medalists for Australia
Paralympic sighted guides
Living people
Medalists at the 2008 Summer Paralympics
Australian female cyclists
Paralympic medalists in cycling
20th-century Australian women
21st-century Australian women